Aborlan Tagbanwa is spoken on Palawan Island in the Philippines. It is not mutually intelligible with the other languages of the Tagbanwa people.

Phonology

Consonants

Vowels

Grammar

Pronouns 
The following table contains the pronouns found in the Aborlan Tagbanwa language. Note: some forms are divided between full and short forms.

References

Palawanic languages
Languages of Palawan